Persatuan Sepakbola Indonesia Trenggalek (en: Football Association of Indonesia Trenggalek)  is an Indonesian football club based in Trenggalek, East Java. They currently compete in the Liga 3.

Supporter
Galakmania is a supporter of Persiga Trenggalek.

Honours
 Liga Indonesia Third Division
 Champions: 2012
 Liga 3 East Java
 Champions: 2018

Kit Suppliers
  Fitsee (2018–2020) 
  Mcloth (2021– present)

References

External links
 Liga-Indonesia.co.id
Persiga Trenggalek at Instagram

Football clubs in Indonesia
Football clubs in East Java
Association football clubs established in 1982
1982 establishments in Indonesia